Kaarlo Vilho Huhtala (13 October 1874 in Ulvila – 7 February 1941) was a Finnish farmer and politician. He took part in the Finnish Civil War on the White side. He was a member of the Parliament of Finland from 1930 to 1933, representing the National Coalition Party. Huhtala was also active in the Lapua Movement.

References

1874 births
1941 deaths
People from Ulvila
People from Turku and Pori Province (Grand Duchy of Finland)
National Coalition Party politicians
Members of the Parliament of Finland (1930–33)
People of the Finnish Civil War (White side)